Belfast Central was a constituency of the Parliament of Northern Ireland.

Boundaries
Belfast Central was a borough constituency comprising part of central Belfast. It was created in 1929, when the House of Commons (Method of Voting and Redistribution of Seats) Act (Northern Ireland) 1929 introduced first-past-the-post elections throughout Northern Ireland.

Belfast Central was created by the division of Belfast West into four new constituencies. It survived unchanged, returning one member of Parliament, until the Parliament of Northern Ireland was temporarily suspended in 1972, and then formally abolished in 1973.

The constituency consisted of inner city areas of Belfast equivalent to the modern areas of Unity, Brown Square, John Street and Lancaster Street. Residential redevelopment caused the electorate to fall sharply from 20,399 in 1929 to 6,384 in 1969. By the time of the dissolution of the Stormont Parliament, it had just over 2,500 voters.

The constituency is now part of Belfast North and Belfast West with most of the former seat now part of the New Lodge ward.

Politics
The constituency was one of the most staunchly nationalist in Belfast. It was initially held by Nationalist Party members, then later by a variety of labour movement activists and members of smaller nationalist parties.  In 1953, a split between three Labour candidates led to the Unionist candidate finishing just 576 votes behind the victor.

Members of Parliament

Election results

References

Central
Northern Ireland Parliament constituencies established in 1929
Northern Ireland Parliament constituencies disestablished in 1973